This is a list of microprocessors designed by AMD containing a 3D integrated graphics processing unit (iGPU), including those under the AMD APU (Accelerated Processing Unit) product series.

Features overview

Graphics API overview

Desktop processors with 3D graphics

APU or Radeon Graphics branded

Lynx: "Llano" (2011)
 Socket FM1
 CPU: K10 (or Husky or K10.5) with no L3 cache cores with an upgraded architecture known as Stars
 L1 Cache: 64 KB Data per core and 64 KB Instructions per core
 MMX, Enhanced 3DNow!, SSE, SSE2, SSE3, SSE4a, ABM, NX bit, AMD64, Cool'n'Quiet, AMD-V
 GPU: TeraScale 2 (Evergreen); all A and E series models feature Redwood-class integrated graphics on die (BeaverCreek for the dual-core variants and WinterPark for the quad-core variants). Sempron and Athlon models exclude integrated graphics.
 List of embedded GPU's
 Support for up to four DIMMs of up to DDR3-1866 memory
 Fabrication 32 nm on GlobalFoundries SOI process; Die size: , with 1.178 billion transistors
 5 GT/s UMI
 Integrated PCIe 2.0 controller
 Select models support Turbo Core technology for faster CPU operation when the thermal specification permits
 Select models support Hybrid Graphics technology to assist a discrete Radeon HD 6450, 6570, or 6670 discrete graphics card. This is similar to the Hybrid CrossFireX technology available in the AMD 700 and 800 chipset series

Virgo: "Trinity" (2012)
 Fabrication 32 nm on GlobalFoundries SOI process
 Socket FM2
 CPU: Piledriver
 L1 Cache: 16 KB Data per core and 64 KB Instructions per module
 GPU TeraScale 3 (VLIW4)
 Die Size: , 1.303 Billion transistors
 Support for up to four DIMMs of up to DDR3-1866 memory
 5 GT/s UMI
 GPU (based on VLIW4 architecture) instruction support: DirectX 11, Opengl 4.2, DirectCompute, Pixel Shader 5.0, Blu-ray 3D, OpenCL 1.2, AMD Stream, UVD3
 Integrated PCIe 2.0 controller, and Turbo Core technology for faster CPU/GPU operation when the thermal specification permits
 MMX, SSE, SSE2, SSE3, SSSE3, SSE4a, SSE4.1, SSE4.2, AMD64, AMD-V, AES, CLMUL, AVX, XOP, FMA3, FMA4, F16C, ABM, BMI1, TBM
 Sempron and Athlon models exclude integrated graphics
 Select models support Hybrid Graphics technology to assist a Radeon HD 7350, 7450, 7470, 7550, 7570, 7670 discrete graphics card. However, it has been found that this does not always improve 3D accelerated graphics performance.

"Richland" (2013)
 Fabrication 32 nm on GlobalFoundries SOI process
 Socket FM2
 Two or four CPU cores based on the Piledriver microarchitecture
 Die Size: , 1.303 Billion transistors
 L1 Cache: 16 KB Data per core and 64 KB Instructions per module
 MMX, SSE, SSE2, SSE3, SSSE3, SSE4a, SSE4.1, SSE4.2, AMD64, AMD-V, AES, AVX, AVX1.1, XOP, FMA3, FMA4, F16C, ABM, BMI1, TBM, Turbo Core 3.0, NX bit, PowerNow!
 GPU
 TeraScale 3 architecture
 HD Media Accelerator, AMD Hybrid Graphics

"Kabini" (2013, SoC) 
 Fabrication 28 nm by GlobalFoundries
 Socket AM1, aka Socket FS1b (AM1 platform)
 2 to 4 CPU Cores (Jaguar (microarchitecture))
 L1 Cache: 32 KB Data per core and 32 KB Instructions per core
 MMX, SSE, SSE2, SSE3, SSSE3, SSE4a, SSE4.1, SSE4.2, AMD64, AVX, F16C, CLMUL, AES, MOVBE (Move Big-Endian instruction), XSAVE/XSAVEOPT, ABM, BMI1, AMD-V support
 SoC with integrated memory, PCIe, 2× USB 3.0, 6× USB 2.0, Gigabit Ethernet, and 2× SATA III (6 Gb/s) controllers
 GPU based on Graphics Core Next (GCN)

"Kaveri" (2014) & "Godavari" (2015)
 Fabrication 28 nm by GlobalFoundries.
 Socket FM2+, support for PCIe 3.0.
 Two or four CPU cores based on the Steamroller microarchitecture.
Kaveri refresh models have codename Godavari.
 Die Size: , 2.41 Billion transistors.
 L1 Cache: 16 KB Data per core and 96 KB Instructions per module.
 MMX, SSE, SSE2, SSE3, SSSE3, SSE4.1, SSE4.2, SSE4a, AMD64, AMD-V, AES, CLMUL, AVX, AVX 1.1, XOP, FMA3, FMA4, F16C, ABM, BMI1, TBM, Turbo Core
 Three to eight Compute Units (CUs) based on GCN 2nd gen microarchitecture; 1 Compute Unit (CU) consists of 64 Unified Shader Processors : 4 Texture Mapping Units (TMUs) : 1 Render Output Unit (ROPs).
 Heterogeneous System Architecture-enabled zero-copy through pointer passing.
 SIP blocks: Unified Video Decoder, Video Coding Engine, TrueAudio.
 Dual-channel (2× 64 Bit) DDR3 memory controller.
 Integrated custom ARM Cortex-A5 co-processor with TrustZone Security Extensions in select APU models, except the Performance APU models.
 Select models support Hybrid Graphics technology by using a Radeon R7 240 or R7 250 discrete graphics card.
 Display controller: AMD Eyefinity 2, 4K Ultra HD support, DisplayPort 1.2 Support.

"Carrizo" (2016)

 Fabrication: 28 nm by GlobalFoundries
 Socket FM2+ or AM4, support for PCIe 3.0
 Two or four CPU cores based on the Excavator microarchitecture
 Die size: , 3.1 billion transistors
 L1 cache: 32 KB data per core and 96 KB instructions per module
 MMX, SSE, SSE2, SSE3, SSSE3, SSE4.1, SSE4.2, SSE4a, AMD64, AMD-V, AES, CLMUL, AVX, AVX 1.1, AVX2, XOP, FMA3, FMA4, F16C, ABM, BMI1, BMI2, TBM, RDRAND, Turbo Core
 Single- or dual-channel DDR3 or DDR4 memory controller
 Third generation GCN-based GPU (Radeon M300)
 Integrated custom ARM Cortex-A5 coprocessor with TrustZone security extensions

"Bristol Ridge" (2016)
 Fabrication 28 nm by GlobalFoundries
 Socket AM4, support for PCIe 3.0
 Two or four "Excavator+" CPU cores
 L1 Cache: 32 KB Data per core and 96 KB Instructions per module
 MMX, SSE, SSE2, SSE3, SSSE3, SSE4.1, SSE4.2, SSE4a, AMD64, AMD-V, AES, CLMUL, AVX, AVX 1.1, AVX2, XOP, FMA3, FMA4, F16C, ABM, BMI1, BMI2, TBM, RDRAND, Turbo Core
 Dual-channel DDR4 memory controller
 PCI Express 3.0 x8 (No Bifurcation support, requires a PCI-e switch for any configuration other than x8)
 PCI Express 3.0 x4 as link to optional external chipset
 4x USB 3.1 Gen 1
 Storage: 2x SATA and 2x NVMe or 2x PCI Express
 Third Generation GCN based GPU with hybrid VP9 decoding

"Raven Ridge" (2018) 

 Fabrication 14 nm by GlobalFoundries
 Transistors: 4.94 billion
 Die size: 210 mm²
 Socket AM4
 Zen CPU cores
 MMX, SSE, SSE2, SSE3, SSSE3, SSE4.1, SSE4.2, SSE4a, AMD64, AMD-V, AES, CLMUL, AVX, AVX 1.1, AVX2, FMA3, F16C, ABM, BMI1, BMI2, RDRAND, Turbo Core
 Dual-channel DDR4 memory controller
 Fifth generation GCN based GPU
 Video Core Next (VCN) 1.0

"Picasso" (2019) 

 Fabrication 12 nm by GlobalFoundries
 Transistors: 4.94 billion
 Die size: 210 mm²
 Socket AM4
 Zen+ CPU cores
 MMX, SSE, SSE2, SSE3, SSSE3, SSE4.1, SSE4.2, SSE4a, AMD64, AMD-V, AES, CLMUL, AVX, AVX 1.1, AVX2, FMA3, F16C, ABM, BMI1, BMI2, RDRAND, Turbo Core
 Dual-channel DDR4 memory controller
 Fifth generation GCN based GPU
 Video Core Next (VCN) 1.0

"Renoir" (2020) 

 Fabrication 7 nm by TSMC
 Socket AM4
 Up to eight Zen 2 CPU cores
 Dual-channel DDR4 memory controller

"Cezanne" (2021) 

 Fabrication 7 nm by TSMC
 Socket AM4
 Up to eight Zen 3 CPU cores
 Dual-channel DDR4 memory controller

Non APU or Radeon Graphics branded

"Raphael" (2022) 

 Fabrication 5 nm (CCD) and 6 nm (cIOD) by TSMC
 Socket AM5
 Up to sixteen Zen 4 CPU cores
 Dual-channel DDR5 memory controller

 Basic iGPU

Server APUs

Opteron X2100-series "Kyoto" (2013) 
 Fabrication 28 nm
 Socket FT3 (BGA)
 4 CPU Cores (Jaguar (microarchitecture))
 L1 Cache: 32 KB Data per core and 32 KB Instructions per core
 MMX, SSE, SSE2, SSE3, SSSE3, SSE4a, SSE4.1, SSE4.2, AVX, F16C, CLMUL, AES, MOVBE (Move Big-Endian instruction), XSAVE/XSAVEOPT, ABM, BMI1, AMD-V support
 Turbo Dock Technology, C6 and CC6 low power states
 GPU based on GCN (Graphics Core Next) architecture

Opteron X3000-series "Toronto" (2017) 
 Fabrication 28 nm
 Socket FP4 
 Two or Four CPU cores based on the Excavator microarchitecture
 L1 Cache: 32 KB Data per core and 96 KB Instructions per module
 MMX, SSE, SSE2, SSE3, SSSE3, SSE4.1, SSE4.2, SSE4a, AMD64, AMD-V, AES, CLMUL, AVX, AVX 1.1, AVX2, XOP, FMA3, FMA4, F16C, ABM, BMI1, BMI2, TBM, RDRAND
 DDR4 SDRAM
 GPU based on 3rd Generation GCN (Graphics Core Next) architecture

Mobile processors with 3D graphics

APU or Radeon Graphics branded

Sabine: "Llano" (2011) 
 Fabrication 32 nm on GlobalFoundries SOI process 
 Socket FS1
 Upgraded Stars (AMD 10h architecture) codenamed Husky CPU cores (K10.5) with no L3 cache, and with Redwood-class integrated graphics on die 
 L1 Cache: 64 KB Data per core and 64 KB Instructions per core(BeaverCreek for the dual-core variants and WinterPark for the quad-core variants)
 Integrated PCIe 2.0 controller
 GPU: TeraScale 2
 Select models support Turbo Core technology for faster CPU operation when the thermal specification permits
 Support for 1.35 V DDR3L-1333 memory, in addition to regular 1.5 V DDR3 memory specified
 2.5 GT/s UMI
 MMX, Enhanced 3DNow!, SSE, SSE2, SSE3, SSE4a, ABM, NX bit, AMD64, AMD-V
 PowerNow!

Comal: "Trinity" (2012) 

 Fabrication 32 nm on GlobalFoundries SOI process
 Socket FS1r2, FP2
 Based on the Piledriver architecture
 L1 Cache: 16 KB Data per core and 64 KB Instructions per module
 GPU: TeraScale 3 (VLIW4)
 MMX, SSE, SSE2, SSE3, SSSE3, SSE4.1, SSE4.2, SSE4a, AMD64, AMD-V, AES, CLMUL, AVX, AVX 1.1, XOP, FMA3, FMA4, F16C, ABM, BMI1, TBM, Turbo Core
 Memory support: 1.35 V DDR3L-1600 memory, in addition to regular 1.5 V DDR3 memory specified (Dual-channel)
 2.5 GT/s UMI
 Transistors: 1.303 billion
 Die size: 246 mm²

"Richland" (2013) 
 Fabrication 32 nm on GlobalFoundries SOI process
 Socket FS1r2, FP2
 Elite Performance APU.
 CPU: Piledriver architecture
 L1 Cache: 16 KB Data per core and 64 KB Instructions per module
 GPU: TeraScale 3 (VLIW4)
 MMX, SSE, SSE2, SSE3, SSSE3, SSE4.1, SSE4.2, SSE4a, AMD64, AMD-V, AES, CLMUL, AVX, AVX 1.1, XOP, FMA3, FMA4, F16C, ABM, BMI1, TBM, Turbo Core

"Kaveri" (2014) 
 Fabrication 28 nm
 Socket FP3
 Up to 4 Steamroller x86 CPU cores with 4 MB of L2 cache.
 L1 Cache: 16 KB Data per core and 96 KB Instructions per module
 MMX, SSE, SSE2, SSE3, SSSE3, SSE4.1, SSE4.2, SSE4a, AMD64, AMD-V, AES, CLMUL, AVX, AVX 1.1, XOP, FMA3, FMA4, F16C, ABM, BMI1, TBM, Turbo Core
 Three to eight Compute Units (CUs) based on Graphics Core Next (GCN) microarchitecture; 1 Compute Unit (CU) consists of 64 Unified Shader Processors : 4 Texture Mapping Units (TMUs) : 1 Render Output Unit (ROPs)
 AMD Heterogeneous System Architecture (HSA) 2.0
 SIP blocks: Unified Video Decoder, Video Coding Engine, TrueAudio
 Dual-channel (2x64-bit) DDR3 memory controller
 Integrated custom ARM Cortex-A5 co-processor with TrustZone Security Extensions

"Carrizo" (2015) 
 Fabrication 28 nm
 Socket FP4
 Up to 4 Excavator x86 CPU cores
 L1 Cache: 32 KB Data per core and 96 KB Instructions per module
 MMX, SSE, SSE2, SSE3, SSSE3, SSE4.1, SSE4.2, SSE4a, AMD64, AMD-V, AES, CLMUL, AVX, AVX 1.1, AVX2, XOP, FMA3, FMA4, F16C, ABM, BMI1, BMI2, TBM, RDRAND, Turbo Core
 GPU based on Graphics Core Next 1.2

"Bristol Ridge" (2016) 
 Fabrication 28 nm
 Socket FP4
 Two or four "Excavator+" x86 CPU cores
 L1 Cache: 32 KB Data per core and 96 KB Instructions per module
 MMX, SSE, SSE2, SSE3, SSSE3, SSE4.1, SSE4.2, SSE4a, AMD64, AMD-V, AES, CLMUL, AVX, AVX 1.1, AVX2, XOP, FMA3, FMA4, F16C, ABM, BMI1, BMI2, TBM, RDRAND, Turbo Core
 GPU based on Graphics Core Next 1.2 with VP9 decoding

"Raven Ridge" (2017)

 Fabrication 14 nm by GlobalFoundries
 Transistors: 4.94 billion
 Socket FP5
 Die size: 210 mm²
 Zen CPU cores
 MMX, SSE, SSE2, SSE3, SSSE3, SSE4.1, SSE4.2, SSE4a, AMD64, AMD-V, AES, CLMUL, AVX, AVX 1.1, AVX2, FMA3, F16C, ABM, BMI1, BMI2, RDRAND, Turbo Core
 Fifth generation GCN-based GPU

"Picasso" (2019) 

 Fabrication 12 nm by GlobalFoundries
 Socket FP5
 Die size: 210 mm²
 Up to four Zen+ CPU cores
 MMX, SSE, SSE2, SSE3, SSSE3, SSE4.1, SSE4.2, SSE4a, AMD64, AMD-V, AES, CLMUL, AVX, AVX 1.1, AVX2, FMA3, F16C, ABM, BMI1, BMI2, RDRAND, Turbo Core
 Dual-channel DDR4 memory controller
 Fifth generation GCN-based GPU

"Renoir" (2020) 

 Fabrication 7 nm by TSMC
 Socket FP6
 Die size: 156 mm²
 9.8 billion transistors on one single 7 nm monolithic die
 Up to eight Zen 2 CPU cores
 L1 cache: 64 KB (32 KB data + 32 KB instruction) per core.
 L2 cache: 512 KB per core.
 Fifth generation GCN-based GPU
 Memory support: DDR4-3200 or LPDDR4-4266 in dual-channel mode.
 All the CPUs support 16 PCIe 3.0 lanes.

U

H

"Lucienne" (2021) 

 Fabrication 7 nm by TSMC
 Socket FP6
 Die size: 156 mm²
 9.8 billion transistors on one single 7 nm monolithic die
 Up to eight Zen 2 CPU cores
 Fifth generation GCN-based GPU (7 nm Vega)

"Cezanne" (2021) 

 Fabrication 7 nm by TSMC
 Socket FP6
 Die size: 180 mm²
 Up to eight Zen 3 CPU cores
 L1 cache: 64 KB (32 KB data + 32 KB instruction) per core.
 L2 cache: 512 KB per core.
 Fifth generation GCN-based GPU
 Memory support: DDR4-3200 or LPDDR4-4266 in dual-channel mode.
 All the CPUs support 16 PCIe 3.0 lanes.

U

H

"Barceló" (2022) 

 Fabrication 7 nm by TSMC
 Socket FP6
 Die size: 180 mm²
 Up to eight Zen 3 CPU cores
 L1 cache: 64 KB (32 KB data + 32 KB instruction) per core.
 L2 cache: 512 KB per core.
 Fifth generation GCN-based GPU
 Memory support: DDR4-3200 or LPDDR4-4266 in dual-channel mode.
 All the CPUs support 16 PCIe 3.0 lanes.

"Rembrandt" (2022) 

 Fabrication 6 nm by TSMC
 Socket FP7
 Die size: 210 mm²
 Up to eight Zen 3+ CPU cores
 Second generation RDNA-based GPU

"Phoenix" (2023) 

 Fabrication 4 nm by TSMC
 Up to eight Zen 4 CPU cores
 Dual-channel DDR5 or LPDDR5x memory controller
 RDNA3 iGPU
 XDNA accelerator

"Dragon Range" (2023) 

 Fabrication 5 nm (CCD) and 6 nm (cIOD) by TSMC
 Up to sixteen Zen 4 CPU cores
 Dual-channel DDR5 memory controller
 Basic RDNA2 iGPU

Ultra-mobile APUs

Brazos: "Desna", "Ontario", "Zacate" (2011)  
 Fabrication 40 nm by TSMC
 Socket FT1 (BGA-413)
 Based on the Bobcat microarchitecture
 L1 Cache: 32 KB Data per core and 32 KB Instructions per core
 MMX, SSE, SSE2, SSE3, SSSE3, SSE4a, ABM, NX bit, AMD64, AMD-V
 PowerNow!
 DirectX 11 integrated graphics with UVD 3.0
 Z-series denote Desna; C-series denote Ontario; and the E-series denotes Zacate
 2.50 GT/s UMI (PCIe 1.0 ×4)

Brazos 2.0: "Ontario", "Zacate" (2012) 
 Fabrication 40 nm by TSMC
 Socket FT1 (BGA-413)
 Based on the Bobcat microarchitecture
 L1 Cache: 32 KB Data per core and 32 KB Instructions per core
 MMX, SSE, SSE2, SSE3, SSSE3, SSE4a, ABM, NX bit, AMD64, AMD-V
 PowerNow!
 DirectX 11 integrated graphics
 C-series denote Ontario; and the E-series denotes Zacate
 2.50 GT/s UMI (PCIe 1.0 ×4)

Brazos-T: "Hondo" (2012) 
 Fabrication 40 nm by TSMC
 Socket FT1 (BGA-413)
 Based on the Bobcat microarchitecture
 L1 Cache: 32 KB Data per core and 32 KB Instructions per core
 Found in tablet computers
 MMX, SSE, SSE2, SSE3, SSSE3, SSE4a, ABM, NX bit, AMD64, AMD-V
 PowerNow!
 DirectX 11 integrated graphics
 2.50 GT/s UMI (PCIe 1.0 ×4)

"Kabini", "Temash" (2013) 
 Fabrication 28 nm by TSMC
 Socket FT3 (BGA)
 2 to 4 CPU Cores (Jaguar (microarchitecture))
 L1 Cache: 32 KB Data per core and 32 KB Instructions per core
 MMX, SSE, SSE2, SSE3, SSSE3, SSE4a, SSE4.1, SSE4.2, AVX, F16C, CLMUL, AES, MOVBE (Move Big-Endian instruction), XSAVE/XSAVEOPT, ABM, BMI1, AMD-V support
 Turbo Dock Technology, C6 and CC6 low power states
 GPU based on Graphics Core Next (GCN)
 AMD Eyefinity multi-monitor for up to two displays

Temash, Elite Mobility APU

Kabini, Mainstream APU

"Beema", "Mullins" (2014) 
 Fabrication 28 nm by GlobalFoundries
 Socket FT3b (BGA)
 CPU: 2 to 4 (Puma cores)
 L1 Cache: 32 KB Data per core and 32 KB Instructions per core
 GPU based on Graphics Core Next (GCN)
 MMX, SSE, SSE2, SSE3, SSSE3, SSE4a, SSE4.1, SSE4.2, AVX, F16C, CLMUL, AES, MOVBE (Move Big-Endian instruction), XSAVE/XSAVEOPT, ABM, BMI1, AMD-V support
 Intelligent Turbo Boost
 Platform Security Processor, with an integrated ARM Cortex-A5 for TrustZone execution

Mullins, Tablet/2-in-1 APU

Beema, Notebook APU

"Carrizo-L" (2015) 
 Fabrication 28 nm by GlobalFoundries
 Socket FT3b (BGA), FP4 (µBGA)
 CPU: 2 to 4 (Puma+ cores)
 L1 Cache: 32 KB Data per core and 32 KB Instructions per core
 GPU based on Graphics Core Next (GCN)
 MMX, SSE, SSE2, SSE3, SSSE3, SSE4a, SSE4.1, SSE4.2, AVX, F16C, CLMUL, AES, MOVBE (Move Big-Endian instruction), XSAVE/XSAVEOPT, ABM, BMI1, AMD-V support
 Intelligent Turbo Boost
 Platform Security Processor, with an integrated ARM Cortex-A5 for TrustZone execution
 All models except A8-7410 available in both laptop and all-in-one desktop versions

"Stoney Ridge" (2016) 
 Fabrication 28 nm by GlobalFoundries
 Socket FP4 / FT4
 2 "Excavator+" x86 CPU cores
 L1 Cache: 32 KB Data per core and 96 KB Instructions per module
 Single-channel DDR4 memory controller
 MMX, SSE, SSE2, SSE3, SSSE3, SSE4.1, SSE4.2, SSE4a, AMD64, AMD-V, AES, CLMUL, AVX, AVX 1.1, AVX2, XOP, FMA3, FMA4, F16C, ABM, BMI1, BMI2, TBM, RDRAND, Turbo Core
 GPU based on Graphics Core Next 3rd Generation with VP9 decoding

"Dalí" (2020) 

 Fabrication 14 nm by GlobalFoundries
 Socket FP5
 Two Zen CPU cores
 Over 30% die size reduction over predecessor (Raven Ridge)
 MMX, SSE, SSE2, SSE3, SSSE3, SSE4.1, SSE4.2, SSE4a, AMD64, AMD-V, AES, CLMUL, AVX, AVX 1.1, AVX2, FMA3, F16C, ABM, BMI1, BMI2, RDRAND, Turbo Core
Dual-channel RAM

"Pollock" (2020) 

 Fabrication 14 nm by GlobalFoundries
 Socket FT5
 Two Zen CPU cores
 MMX, SSE, SSE2, SSE3, SSSE3, SSE4.1, SSE4.2, SSE4a, AMD64, AMD-V, AES, CLMUL, AVX, AVX 1.1, AVX2, FMA3, F16C, ABM, BMI1, BMI2, RDRAND, Turbo Core
Single-channel RAM

"Mendocino" (2022)

Embedded APUs

G-Series

Brazos: "Ontario" and "Zacate" (2011) 
 Fabrication 40 nm
 Socket FT1 (BGA-413)
 CPU microarchitecture: Bobcat
 L1 Cache: 32 KB Data per core and 32 KB Instructions per core
 MMX, SSE, SSE2, SSE3, SSSE3, SSE4a, ABM, NX bit, AMD64, AMD-V
 GPU microarchitecture: TeraScale 2 (VLIW5) "Evergreen"
 Memory support: single-channel, support up to two DIMMs of DDR3-1333 or DDR3L-1066 
 5 GT/s UMI

"Kabini" (2013, SoC) 
 Fabrication 28 nm
 Socket FT3 (769-BGA)
 CPU microarchitecture: Jaguar
 L1 Cache: 32 KB Data per core and 32 KB Instructions per core
 MMX, SSE, SSE2, SSE3, SSSE3, SSE4a, SSE4.1, SSE4.2, AVX, F16C, CLMUL, AES, MOVBE (Move Big-Endian instruction), XSAVE/XSAVEOPT, ABM, BMI1, AMD-V support. No support for FMA (Fused Multiply-Accumulate). Trusted Platform Module (TPM) 1.2 support
 GPU microarchitecture: Graphics Core Next (GCN) with Unified Video Decoder 3 (H.264, VC-1, MPEG2, etc.)
 Single channel DDR3-1600, 1.25 and 1.35 V voltage level support, support for ECC memory
 Integrates Controller Hub functional block, HD audio, 2 SATA channels, USB 2.0 and USB 3.0 (except GX-210JA)

"Steppe Eagle" (2014, SoC) 
 Fabrication 28 nm
 Socket FT3b (769-BGA)
 CPU microarchitecture: Puma
 L1 Cache: 32 KB Data per core and 32 KB Instructions per core
 MMX, SSE, SSE2, SSE3, SSSE3, SSE4a, SSE4.1, SSE4.2, AVX, F16C, CLMUL, AES, MOVBE (Move Big-Endian instruction), XSAVE/XSAVEOPT, ABM, BMI1, AMD-V support

"Crowned Eagle" (2014, SoC) 
 Fabrication 28 nm
 Socket FT3b (769-BGA)
 CPU microarchitecture: Puma
 L1 Cache: 32 KB Data per core and 32 KB Instructions per core
 MMX, SSE, SSE2, SSE3, SSSE3, SSE4a, SSE4.1, SSE4.2, AVX, F16C, CLMUL, AES, MOVBE (Move Big-Endian instruction), XSAVE/XSAVEOPT, ABM, BMI1, AMD-V support
 no GPU

LX-Family (2016, SoC) 
 Fabrication 28 nm
 Socket FT3b (769-BGA)
 2 Puma x86 cores with 1MB shared L2 cache
 L1 Cache: 32 KB Data per core and 32 KB Instructions per core
 MMX, SSE, SSE2, SSE3, SSSE3, SSE4a, SSE4.1, SSE4.2, AVX, F16C, CLMUL, AES, MOVBE (Move Big-Endian instruction), XSAVE/XSAVEOPT, ABM, BMI1, AMD-V support
 GPU microarchitecture: Graphics Core Next (GCN) (1CU) with support for DirectX 11.2
 Single channel 64-bit DDR3 memory with ECC
 Integrated Controller Hub supports: PCIe® 2.0 4×1, 2 USB3 + 4 USB2 ports, 2 SATA 2.0/3.0 ports

I-Family: "Brown Falcon" (2016, SoC) 
 Fabrication 28 nm
 Socket FP4
 2 or 4 Excavator x86 cores with 1MB shared L2 cache
 L1 Cache: 32 KB Data per core and 96 KB Instructions per module
 MMX, SSE, SSE2, SSE3, SSSE3, SSE4.1, SSE4.2, SSE4a, AMD64, AMD-V, AES, CLMUL, AVX, AVX 1.1, AVX2, XOP, FMA3, FMA4, F16C, ABM, BMI1, BMI2, TBM, RDRAND
 GPU microarchitecture: Graphics Core Next (GCN) (up to 4 CUs) with support for DirectX 12
 Dual channel 64-bit DDR4 or DDR3 memory with ECC
 4K × 2K H.265 decode capability and multi format encode and decode
 Integrated Controller Hub supports: PCIe 3.0 1×4, PCIe 2/3 4×1, 2 USB3 + 2 USB2 ports, 2 SATA 2.0/3.0 ports

J-Family: "Prairie Falcon" (2016, SoC) 
 Fabrication 28 nm
 Socket FP4
 2 "Excavator+" x86 cores with 1MB shared L2 cache
 L1 Cache: 32 KB Data per core and 96 KB Instructions per module
 MMX, SSE, SSE2, SSE3, SSSE3, SSE4.1, SSE4.2, SSE4a, AMD64, AMD-V, AES, CLMUL, AVX, AVX 1.1, AVX2, XOP, FMA3, FMA4, F16C, ABM, BMI1, BMI2, TBM, RDRAND
 GPU microarchitecture: Radeon R5E Graphics Core Next (GCN) (up to 3 CUs) with support for DirectX 12
 Single channel 64-bit DDR4 or DDR3 memory
 4K × 2K H.265 decode capability with 10-bit compatibility and multi format encode and decode
 Integrated Controller Hub supports: PCIe 3.0 1×4, PCIe 2/3 4×1, 2 USB3 + 2 USB2 ports, 2 SATA 2.0/3.0 ports

R-Series

Comal: "Trinity" (2012) 
 Fabrication 32 nm
 Socket FP2 (BGA-827), FS1r2
 CPU microarchitecture: Piledriver
 L1 Cache: 16 KB Data per core and 64 KB Instructions per module
 MMX, SSE, SSE2, SSE3, SSSE3, SSE4a, SSE4.1, SSE4.2, AMD64, AMD-V, AES, CLMUL, AVX 1.1, XOP, FMA3, FMA4, F16C, ABM, BMI1, TBM
 GPU microarchitecture: TeraScale 3 (VLIW4) "Northern Islands"
 Memory support: dual-channel 1.35 V DDR3L-1600 memory, in addition to regular 1.5 V DDR3
 2.5 GT/s UMI
 Die size: 246 mm²; Transistors: 1.303 billion
 OpenCL 1.1 and OpenGL 4.2 support

"Bald Eagle" (2014) 
 Fabrication 28 nm
 Socket FP3 
 Up to 4 Steamroller x86 cores
 L1 Cache: 16 KB Data per core and 96 KB Instructions per module
 MMX, SSE, SSE2, SSE3, SSSE3, SSE4a, SSE4.1, SSE4.2, AMD64, AMD-V, AES, CLMUL, AVX 1.1, XOP, FMA3, FMA4, F16C, ABM, BMI1, TBM
 GPU microarchitecture: Graphics Core Next (GCN) (up to 8 CUs) with support for DirectX 11.1 and OpenGL 4.2
 Dual channel DDR3 memory with ECC
 Unified Video Decode (UVD) 4.2 and Video Coding Engine (VCE) 2.0

"Merlin Falcon" (2015, SoC) 
 Fabrication 28 nm
 Socket FP4 
 Up to 4 Excavator x86 cores
 L1 Cache: 32 KB Data per core and 96 KB Instructions per module
 MMX, SSE, SSE2, SSE3, SSSE3, SSE4.1, SSE4.2, SSE4a, AMD64, AMD-V, AES, CLMUL, AVX, AVX 1.1, AVX2, XOP, FMA3, FMA4, F16C, ABM, BMI1, BMI2, TBM, RDRAND
 GPU microarchitecture: Graphics Core Next (GCN) (up to 8 CUs) with support for DirectX 12
 Dual channel 64-bit DDR4 or DDR3 memory with ECC
 Unified Video Decode (UVD) 6 (4K H.265 and H.264 decode) and Video Coding Engine (VCE) 3.1 (4K H.264 encode)
 Dedicated AMD Secure Processor supports secure boot with AMD Hardware Validated Boot (HVB)
 Integrated FCH featuring PCIe 3.0 USB3.0, SATA3, SD, GPIO, SPI, I2S, I2C, UART

1000-Series

V1000-Family: "Great Horned Owl" (2018, SoC) 
 Fabrication 14 nm by GlobalFoundries
 Up to 4 Zen cores
 Socket FP5
 MMX, SSE, SSE2, SSE3, SSSE3, SSE4.1, SSE4.2, SSE4a, AMD64, AMD-V, AES, CLMUL, AVX, AVX 1.1, AVX2, FMA3, F16C, ABM, BMI1, BMI2, RDRAND, Turbo Core
 Dual channel DDR4 memory with ECC
 Fifth generation GCN based GPU

R1000-Family: "Banded Kestrel" (2019, SoC) 
 Fabrication 14 nm by GlobalFoundries
 Up to 2 Zen cores
 Socket FP5
 MMX, SSE, SSE2, SSE3, SSSE3, SSE4.1, SSE4.2, SSE4a, AMD64, AMD-V, AES, CLMUL, AVX, AVX 1.1, AVX2, FMA3, F16C, ABM, BMI1, BMI2, RDRAND, Turbo Core
 Dual channel DDR4 memory with ECC
 Fifth generation GCN based GPU

2000-Series

V2000-Family: "Grey Hawk" (2020, SoC) 
 Fabrication 7 nm by TSMC
 Up to 8 Zen 2 cores
 Fifth generation GCN based GPU

R2000-Family: "River Hawk" (2022, SoC) 
 Fabrication 12 nm by GlobalFoundries
 Up to 4 Zen+ cores
 MMX, SSE, SSE2, SSE3, SSSE3, SSE4.1, SSE4.2, SSE4a, AMD64, AMD-V, AES, CLMUL, AVX, AVX 1.1, AVX2, FMA3, F16C, ABM, BMI1, BMI2, RDRAND, Turbo Core

Custom APUs 
As of May 1, 2013, AMD opened the doors of their "semi-custom" business unit. Since these chips are custom-made for specific customer needs, they vary widely from both consumer-grade APUs and even the other custom-built ones. Some notable examples of semi-custom chips that have come from this sector include the chips from the PlayStation 4 and Xbox One. So far the size of the integrated GPU in these semi-custom APUs exceed by far the GPU size in the consumer-grade APUs.

See also 
 List of AMD chipsets
 List of AMD FX microprocessors
 List of AMD graphics processing units
 Ryzen

Notes

References

External links 
 
 Technical specification AMD products
 AMD products and technologies

Fusion
Lists of microprocessors